Pterolophia undulata is a species of beetle in the family Cerambycidae. It was described by Francis Polkinghorne Pascoe in 1862. It is known from Moluccas.

Subspecies
 Pterolophia undulata undulata (Pascoe, 1862)
 Pterolophia undulata satrapa (Pascoe, 1865)
 Pterolophia undulata tidorensis Breuning & de Jong, 1941

References

undulata
Beetles described in 1862